S-TEC Corporation is a United States corporation that was founded in 1978 and is headquartered in Mineral Wells, Texas. It manufactures flight control systems for the General Aviation aftermarket and for a number of original equipment manufacturers.  S-TEC is the leader in the general aviation autopilot market for small- and mid-sized planes.

Customers
Genesys Aerosystems has a number of forward-fit autopilot customers including Pilatus, Indonesian Aerospace, Epic Aircraft, and Aviat Aircraft. Their latest autopilot, the S-TEC 3100, has earned Supplemental Type Certificate (STC) on over 100 aircraft models.

History
Meggitt acquired S-TEC and S-TEC Unmanned Technologies (SUTI) for $24 million in 2000. (DRS Technologies purchased the UAV business from Meggitt in 2002 but later closed the Mineral Wells facility.)

S-TEC was purchased for $38 million by Cobham plc in 2008.

In April 2014, Cobham sold Chelton Flight Systems and S-TEC Corporation to Genesys Aerosystems.

Products

Avionics
 Autopilot for small- and mid-sized planes
 S-TEC 5000
 S-TEC 3100
 S-TEC 2100
 S-TEC IntelliFlight 1950
 S-TEC System 65
 S-TEC System 60-2
 S-TEC System 55X
 S-TEC System 40/50
 S-TEC System 30ALT/60PSS
 S-TEC System 20/30
 SA-200 Altitude Pre-Selector
 ST-360 Altitude Pre-Selector w/Alerter
 GPSS
 Yaw Damper

Aircraft
 S-TEC Sentry

References

External links
Genesys Aerosystems

Aircraft component manufacturers of the United States
Avionics companies
Electronic design
Manufacturing companies established in 1978
Technology companies established in 1978
Manufacturing companies based in Texas